Georgia Holt (born Jackie Jean Crouch; June 9, 1926 – December 10, 2022) was an American singer-songwriter, actress and model. She was also notable for being the mother of singer and actress Cher.

Early life
In Kensett, Arkansas in 1926,  Holt was born Jackie Jean Crouch to 13-year-old Lynda Inez Gulley (February 8, 1913 - May 13, 2009) and Roy Malloy Crouch (July 17, 1905 - June 18, 1969), a 21-year-old baker. Holt said she was of English, German, Irish, French, Dutch, and Cherokee descent. Frequently moving back and forth between her separated parents, Holt estimated that she attended 17 junior high schools. Her father taught her how to sing and play guitar.

Career
Holt sang on an Oklahoma City radio station when she was six years old, and by the age of 10, had sung with Bob Wills and the Texas Playboys. She won several talent and beauty competitions, and had a number of minor television and film roles in the 1950s. These included Watch the Birdie (1950), Grounds for Marriage (1951) and Lovely to Look At (1952). However, by the mid-1950s, Holt's income was largely derived from working as a club singer.

After performing in a singers' workshop (Phil Moore's "Get Your Act Together") in July 1978 at Studio One in Los Angeles, Mike Douglas, Merv Griffin, and Dinah Shore booked Holt to appear on their television talk shows. Holt also appeared as an audience polling member as part of a group of ten mothers of famous celebrities on the U.S. game show Card Sharks from July 4 to 8, 1988.

Holt was the subject of the 2013 Lifetime documentary Dear Mom, Love Cher, which was executive produced by her daughter, Cher. The same year, Holt also released her album Honky Tonk Woman, which was recorded in 1982 with Elvis Presley's band. It was Holt's discovery of the tapes which led to the documentary project. The album includes a duet with Cher titled "I'm Just Your Yesterday".

In 2013, Holt and Cher appeared together on The Tonight Show with Jay Leno and The Ellen DeGeneres Show to promote the documentary and album.

Personal life
Holt was married and divorced six times. She and her first husband, Armenian-American truck driver John Paul Sarkisian, had daughter Cher in 1946 when Holt was 19; she briefly remarried and divorced him again 19 years later. Holt's second husband was actor John Southall, with whom she had her second child, actress Georganne LaPiere. She later wed Joseph Harper Collins, after whom she married Gilbert Hartmann LaPiere, a bank manager who legally adopted Cher and Georganne and changed their surnames to LaPiere. Holt's last marriage was to Hamilton T. Holt, by whose surname she became known.

From 1976 until her death, Holt was in a relationship with Craig Spencer. Holt was 50 and running an antiques shop when she met the then 21-year-old Spencer, who was initially interested in her daughter Georganne.

Holt had two grandsons, Cher's children, Chaz Bono and Elijah Blue Allman. 

On December 10, 2022, Cher announced on Twitter that Holt had died. Holt was survived by Spencer, her daughters and grandsons. She was 96 years old.

Filmography

Discography

Bibliography

References

External links

1926 births
2022 deaths
American film actresses
Female models from Alabama
American women country singers
American country singer-songwriters
American women singer-songwriters
People from Kensett, Arkansas
Actresses from Arkansas
Country musicians from Arkansas
American people of Irish descent
American people of English descent
American people of German descent
American people who self-identify as being of Native American descent
American television actresses
20th-century American singers
Singer-songwriters from Arkansas
20th-century American women singers
21st-century American singers
21st-century American women singers